Pinsel may refer to:

 Type of heraldic flag
 Johann Georg Pinsel, 18th-century sculptor from Red Ruthenia